The crested tit or European crested tit (Lophophanes cristatus) (formerly Parus cristatus), is a passerine bird in the tit family Paridae. It is a widespread and common resident breeder in coniferous forests throughout central and northern Europe and in deciduous woodland in France and the Iberian peninsula. In Great Britain, it is chiefly restricted to the ancient pinewoods of Inverness and Strathspey in Scotland, and seldom strays far from its haunts. A few vagrant crested tits have been seen in England. It is resident, and most individuals do not migrate.

Taxonomy and systematics
This species was formerly placed in Parus, but the distinctness of Lophophanes is well supported,  and it is now recognised by the American Ornithologists' Union and the British Ornithologists' Union as a distinct genus.

The current genus name, Lophophanes, is from the Ancient Greek lophos, "crest", and 
phaino, "to show". The specific cristatus is Latin for "crested".

Behaviour and ecology

It is an easy tit to recognise, for besides its erectile crest, the tip of which is often recurved, its gorget and collar are distinctive. It is, like other tits, talkative, and birds keep up a constant zee, zee, zee , similar to that of the coal tit.

It makes a nest in a hole in rotting stumps. This bird often feeds low down in trees, but although not shy, it is not always easily approached. It will join winter tit flocks with other species.

Like other tits it is found in pairs and it feeds on insects (including caterpillars) and seeds.

Gallery

References

External links
Crested tit videos, photos & sounds on the Internet Bird Collection
Song of the crested tit (Real Audio soundfile from Sveriges Radio P2)
Ageing and sexing (PDF; 2.3 MB) by Javier Blasco-Zumeta & Gerd-Michael Heinze

Lophophanes
Birds of Europe
Birds described in 1758
Taxa named by Carl Linnaeus